Eochanna chorlakkiensis is an extinct prehistoric snakehead.  The fish lived in the Lutetian age of the Middle Eocene (41-48 million years ago) in the area of what is now the Kuldana Formation near Chorlakki, Pakistan.

References

Channidae
Fossil taxa described in 1991